Sara Errani and Flavia Pennetta were the defending champions, but Pennetta decided not to participate.Errani partnered up with Roberta Vinci, but they lost in the semifinals against Vania King and Yaroslava Shvedova. Alla Kudryavtseva and Anastasia Rodionova won in the final 3–6, 6–3, [10–6] against King and Shvedova .

Seeds

Draw

{{16TeamBracket-Compact-Tennis3-Byes
| RD1=First round
| RD2=Quarterfinals
| RD3=Semifinals
| RD4=Finals

| RD1-seed01=1
| RD1-team01= S-w Hsieh A Medina Garrigues
| RD1-score01-1=6
| RD1-score01-2=6
| RD1-score01-3= 
| RD1-seed02= 
| RD1-team02=
| RD1-score02-1=4
| RD1-score02-2=4
| RD1-score02-3= 

| RD1-seed03= 
| RD1-team03= S Peers L Robson
| RD1-score03-1=5
| RD1-score03-2=6
| RD1-score03-3=[6]
| RD1-seed04= 
| RD1-team04= K Jans IR Olaru
| RD1-score04-1=7
| RD1-score04-2=1
| RD1-score04-3=[10]

| RD1-seed05=3
| RD1-team05= A Kudryavtseva A Rodionova
| RD1-score05-1=3
| RD1-score05-2=6
| RD1-score05-3=[11]
| RD1-seed06= 
| RD1-team06= S Borwell R Kops-Jones
| RD1-score06-1=6
| RD1-score06-2=4
| RD1-score06-3=[9]

| RD1-seed07= 
| RD1-team07= T Poutchek İ Şenoğlu
| RD1-score07-1=7
| RD1-score07-2=61
| RD1-score07-3=[10]
| RD1-seed08= 
| RD1-team08= M Kondratieva V Uhlířová
| RD1-score08-1=5
| RD1-score08-2=7
| RD1-score08-3=[7]

| RD1-seed09= 
| RD1-team09= S Lefèvre M-È Pelletier
| RD1-score09-1=2
| RD1-score09-2=3
| RD1-score09-3= 
| RD1-seed10= 
| RD1-team10= M Czink A Parra Santonja
| RD1-score10-1=6
| RD1-score10-2=6
| RD1-score10-3= 

| RD1-seed11= 
| RD1-team11= L Dekmeijere R Zalameda
| RD1-score11-1=0
| RD1-score11-2=3
| RD1-score11-3= 
| RD1-seed12=4
| RD1-team12= V King Y Shvedova
| RD1-score12-1=6
| RD1-score12-2=6
| RD1-score12-3= 

| RD1-seed13= 
| RD1-team13= T Malek A Petkovic
| RD1-score13-1=4
| RD1-score13-2=2
| RD1-score13-3= 
| RD1-seed14= 
| RD1-team14= S Errani R Vinci
| RD1-score14-1=6
| RD1-score14-2=6
| RD1-score14-3= 

| RD1-seed15=WC
| RD1-team15= S Arvidsson A Rus
| RD1-score15-1=1
| RD1-score15-2=2
| RD1-score15-3= 
| RD1-seed16=2
| RD1-team16= M Kirilenko E Vesnina
| RD1-score16-1=6
| RD1-score16-2=6
| RD1-score16-3= 

| RD2-seed01=1
| RD2-team01=

References
 Main Draw

UNICEF Open - Women's Doubles
Rosmalen Grass Court Championships